Donita Nose (born Rodello Juntos Solano on June 29, 1979) is a Filipina comic, actress and TV host on the GMA Network. She is best known as a transgender comic in Punch Line and Klownz together with other celebrities in showbiz like Super Tekla, Iyah, Boobay and Ate Gay. Nose is also known as one of the television hosts of Wowowin, together with Super Tekla and Willie Revillame. She also impersonates the actress and MTV VJ Donita Rose, where her screen name was taken from.

On July 27, Nose tested positive for COVID-19, after she experienced symptoms of the disease.

Filmography

Television

See also
 Donita Rose
 Willie Revillame
 Boobay
 Petite (comedian)
 Betong Sumaya
 Ate Gay

References

External links

1979 births
Living people
Filipino television presenters
Filipino television variety show hosts
Filipino male comedians
Filipino male television actors
People from Metro Manila
Tagalog people
ABS-CBN personalities
GMA Network personalities
TV5 (Philippine TV network) personalities
21st-century Filipino LGBT people